is a passenger railway station in located in the city of  Kyōtango, Kyoto Prefecture, Japan, operated by the private railway company Willer Trains (Kyoto Tango Railway).

Lines
Mineyama Station is a station of the Miyazu Line, and is located 48.3 kilometers from the terminus of the line at Nishi-Maizuru Station.

Station layout
The station has one ground-level island platform and one ground-level side platform connected by an elevated station building. The station is attended. The station building features the motif of a loom and houses a ticket window, a kiosk and a waiting room.

Platforms

Adjacent stations

History
The station opened on November 3, 1925.

Passenger statistics
In fiscal 2018, the station was used by an average of 266 passengers daily.

Surrounding area
 former Mineyama Town Hall
 Kyoto Prefectural Mineyama High School

See also
List of railway stations in Japan

References

External links

Official home page 

Railway stations in Kyoto Prefecture
Railway stations in Japan opened in 1925
Kyōtango